Bagh Ali may refer to:

Bagh Ali-ye Olya
Bagh Ali-ye Sofla